Lam Kor-wan (born 22May 1955) is a Hong Kong serial killer.

Early life

Childhood 
Lam was born in British Hong Kong on 22 May 1955 as Lam Kwok-yue. From 1957 to 1962, his father worked for a petroleum company in Brunei, and Lam and his sister went to live with his mother in the company's dormitory, together with his concubine and half-siblings. In December 1962, Lam returned to Hong Kong with his family and moved into his own home in Morrison Street, Kwun Tong, where he attended a government elementary school, usually in the top ten. In 1970, Lam's father opened a store named Navy Doors selling motorcycles and asked him to help out in the shop after school every day, which led to a decline in Lam's grades and a deterioration in his relationship with his father, who often scolded him and drove him away from home. After graduating from secondary school, Lam started working in his father's motorcycle store in Hong Ning Road, Kwun Tong, and then worked as an air-conditioning apprentice for a relative.

Adulthood 
In early 1973, Lam was expelled from his home after an argument with his father. He was arrested after he threatened a woman with a knife and touched her lower body with his hand near a public toilet in Southwark Street, Hung Hom. After 102 days of treatment in Cassie Hill Mental Clinic, he was discharged and temporarily renamed Lam Yau-keung. When Lam was about 19 years old, his family noticed that he was behaving abnormally and was interested in female flesh. He was later caught peeping at his sister's naked body outside the toilet of his residence in Kwun Tong. In 1978, Lam obtained a cab license and changed his name to Lam Kor-wan after he officially became a cab driver, and in about 1980, he became a night-time cab driver. In 1981, he suddenly became interested in photography and began to study photography techniques and joined a photography club. One year after Lam worked as a night-time cab driver, his mother noticed that his behavior had changed significantly, such as his refusal to change clothes and take a shower, and his depressed behavior.

Crimes
Lam, who worked as a taxi driver, would pick up female passengers, strangle them with electrical wire, take them to his family home, and dismember them. His English moniker, "The Jars Murderer", was coined when the police revealed that he had hoarded sexual organs in Tupperware containers. He was a keen photographer and frequently took pictures and video of his victims, even filming himself performing an act of necrophilia with his fourth victim. The Chinese press nicknamed him "The Rainy Night Butcher" because several of his attacks occurred during inclement weather.

Lam shared his bedroom with his brother, who was unaware of his activities; Lam worked the night-shift, so he was able to dismember victims at home during the daytime without his immediate family finding out. The brother was initially a suspect in the investigation, but police later determined that Lam acted alone. The bodies were disposed of via his taxi in the New Territories and on Hong Kong Island, and all were eventually located.

Chan Fung-lan 
On 3 February 1982, 22-year-old nightclub dancer Chan Fung-lan took a cab outside Ronsé Chinese Restaurant in Kimberley Road, Tsim Sha Tsui at 4:00 a.m., after drinking with friends. After driving her to Kwun Tong, he drove her back downstairs to his home in Kwei Chau Street and returned to his home to retrieve the electricity, then strangled her to death in the car and took her body home to hide it under the sofa in the living room. The next day, after the people in the house had gone out, Lam stripped the body of its clothes and took pictures of the body. The body was then dismembered into seven pieces and the process was recorded in the video "Serious Secrets". The sexual organs were placed in a plastic box and preserved with rice wine, and the body was wrapped in newspaper and placed in a plastic bag. The body was later washed down the Shing Mun River by heavy rain and floated to the area between Happy Fort Canton and Royale Shinja.

Chan Wan-kit 
Chan Wan-kit took a cab from work at 5:20 a.m on 29 May 1982. She was then handcuffed and strangled to death with an electric cord. This time, Lam used a surgical scalpel to dismember the victim and cut off both breasts and the entire pubic area for embalming. The rest of the body was wrapped in newspaper and then placed in a sack, and the body was placed in the trunk of a cab to be disposed of at night on the slope of Tai Hang Road. The dismemberment was recorded in the video "A Serious Secret".

Leung Sau-wan 
29-year-old Leung Sau-wan got off work at 4 a.m. on 17 June 1982 and took a taxi driven by Lam. She was killed soon after. Lam took the body home to take pictures and video of the dismemberment. The video was called "Operation Rainy Night". In order to facilitate "work", Lam put the camcorder on a bed and used the selfie function to take pictures of his actions. Since there is no need to manipulate the camcorder, Lam's dismemberment work was more careful than the last two times. He even cut the abdomen of Leung, picked out the intestines, and put them in his mouth to taste. Lam had the urge to taste human flesh, but finally gave up because he felt sick. The limbs were abandoned on Tai Hang Road.

Leung Wai-sum 
After attending a thank-you party at the Sheraton Hotel on 2 July 1982, Leung Wai-sum boarded a cab outside the hotel at 11:00 p.m. to return to her apartment in Valley Road Estate in Hung Hom and has been missing since then. The family members called the students who went to the banquet and searched for him in Tsim Sha Tsui, but to no avail. The police reported the missing person's information to all police patrols and hospitals in Hong Kong, and issued a search notice and photos on August 5 to appeal to the public for information, but there were still no results. Lam claimed that he handcuffed Leung's hands and strangled her with an electric cord after talking to her in a cab about school, her future, her family, religion, and her soul, and then took the body home to rape and dismember it.

Arrest
Lam was arrested by plain clothes officers on 17August 1982. He had attempted to develop photographs of one of his dismembered victims at a Kodak shop. The manager of the Mong Kok shop tipped off the police and they were waiting for him when he returned to pick up the photos. When confronted, Lam claimed that the photographs belonged to a friend of his who worked on a ship who would meet him shortly; when the man did not appear the police accompanied Lam to his parents' first floor apartment on Kwei Chau Street and performed a search. The police located an old ammunition box in the bedroom he shared with his brother; the box contained pornography and more photographs of body parts, video tapes and several Tupperware containers containing women's sexual organs.

Trial
On 8April 1983, at the end of a long three-week trial with a seven-man jury, Lam was found guilty of four counts of murder and sentenced to death by hanging. On 29August 1984, Lam's sentence was commuted to life imprisonment, as was the tradition before the abolition of the death penalty in Hong Kong in 1993. He is currently serving his life sentence at the maximum-security Shek Pik Prison. When speaking to psychiatrist Dr. William Green, Lam stated that he "ate part of the intestine of one of the victims", and that his motivation was not primarily sexual, but that "it was God who told him to kill the victims".

Victims

Chan Fung-lan, female, age 22, body found in seven separate pieces in the Shing Mun River, New Territories.
Chan Wan-kit, female, age 31, body found in a rice bag near Tai Hang Road, Hong Kong Island.
Leung Sau-wan, female, age 29, body found in a rice bag near Tai Hang Road, Hong Kong Island.
Leung Wai-sum, female, age 17, body found in a rice bag near Tai Hang Road, Hong Kong Island.

The victims in this case were identified by two lecturers from the Prince Philip Dental Hospital, part of the University of Hong Kong, who created and perfected a new system of photo-superimposition.  This involved taking an ante-mortem photograph of the possible victim with a radio-graph (x-ray) of post-mortem skull of the possible victim and superimposing the photo on the skull and matching similarities, similar to the forensic method employed with fingerprints.

In popular culture
Lam Kor-wan is portrayed by Hong Kong actor Simon Yam in the movie Dr. Lamb (1992).

A fictionalised Lam was later portrayed by Lawrence Ng in the 1994 film The Underground Banker. It imagines Lam, now released from prison, as a reformed Buddhist who is friendly and helpful to his neighbour and only returns to his psychotic killing state to help his neighbour take revenge on Triads who raped, murdered or maimed most of his family.

The 1999 film Trust me U Die is sometimes known by the alternate title The New Dr. Lamb, but has no connection to Lam Kor-Wan or the previous film except that both star Simon Yam.

See also
List of serial killers by country
Human cannibalism

References

Hong Kong Murders (2001). Kate Whitehead. 
The Jars Murderer (2010) Crime & Investigation Network (South East Asia)
web.amnesty.org
ojp.usdoj.gov
https://hknews.lib.hku.hk/newspaper/view/23_01.02/37342.pdf
https://hknews.lib.hku.hk/newspaper/view/23_01.02/37341.pdf
https://hknews.lib.hku.hk/newspaper/view/23_01.02/37337.pdf

1955 births
Cannibals
Hong Kong serial killers
Living people
Male serial killers
Necrophiles
People convicted of murder by Hong Kong
Prisoners sentenced to death by Hong Kong
Prisoners sentenced to life imprisonment by Hong Kong
Lam Kor-wan